A Phule And His Money is the third novel of the comic military science fiction Phule's Company series by Robert Asprin. The book was first published by Ace Books in October 1999, and follows the adventures of Willard J. Phule.

1999 science fiction novels
American science fiction novels
Comic science fiction novels
Military science fiction novels
1999 American novels
Ace Books books